16th Visual Effects Society Awards
February 13, 2018

Best Visual Effects in a Visual Effects Driven Motion Picture:
War for the Planet of the Apes

Best Visual Effects in a Photoreal Episode:
Game of Thrones – Beyond the Wall

The 16th Visual Effects Society Awards was held in Los Angeles at the Beverly Hilton Hotel on February 13, 2018, in honor to the best visual effects in film and television of 2017.

Winners and nominees
(winners in bold)

Honorary Awards
Lifetime Achievement Award:
Jon Favreau
VES Georges Méliès Award
Joe Letteri

Film

Television

Other categories

References

External links
 Visual Effects Society

2017
2017 film awards
2017 television awards